Faculty commons may refer to:
A common room for academic faculty at an educational institution.
The Senior Common Room of a British university.
Faculty Commons, the faculty ministry of Cru.